Masiulis is the masculine form of a Lithuanian family name. Its feminine forms  are: Masiulienė (married woman or widow) and Masiulytė (unmarried woman).

The surname may refer to:

Algimantas Masiulis (1931-2008), Lithuanian film and theater actor
Artūras Masiulis (born 1980), Lithuanian basketball player
Gytis Masiulis (born 1998), Lithuanian basketball player
Tomas Masiulis (born 1975), Lithuanian national basketball team player
Laurynas Masiulis, baptizing name of Laurynas Gucevičius, an 18th-century Lithuanian architect 
Juozas Masiulis, Lithuanian knygnešys
Eligijus Masiulis (born 1974), Lithuanian politician, member of Seimas, Minister of Communications (2008)

Lithuanian-language surnames